The October Man is a 1947 mystery film/film noir starring John Mills and Joan Greenwood, written by novelist Eric Ambler, who also produced. A man is suspected of murder, and the lingering effects of a brain injury he sustained in an earlier accident, as well as an intensive police investigation, make him begin to doubt whether he is innocent.

Plot
When a bus crashes due to faulty steering, passenger Jim Ackland (John Mills) sustains a serious brain injury and a young girl under his care is killed. Guilt-ridden, he attempts suicide twice during his recovery.

He starts a new job as an industrial chemist and gets a room in a hotel. When he reluctantly accepts an invitation for a night out, he meets Jenny Carden (Joan Greenwood), the sister of his colleague Harry (Patrick Holt). They begin seeing each other quite regularly. Things reach the point that he confesses he wants to marry her, but he tells her that he wants to be sure he has fully recovered first.

Molly Newman (Kay Walsh), one of the other hotel residents, asks to borrow £30 from him, a rather substantial sum. As he does not have that much on him, Jim agrees to write her a cheque. She is found strangled the next night.

Wilcox (Jack Melford), a married businessman Molly had been seeing, has an alibi. Jim admits to have been walking in the vicinity of the murder site. That and the recovered cheque from the crime scene and his head injury make him the prime suspect. Police Inspector Godby (Frederick Piper) suspects he was another of Molly's boyfriends and that after falling in love with Jenny, he wanted to rid himself of a possible blackmailer.

When Jim learns that Mr Peachy, the person who lived in the room directly below Molly's, had falsely told the police that Jim was in her room every night, Jim confronts him in his room. Peachy brazenly admits killing Molly since he is confident that there is no evidence against him. He had regularly given her money. When Jim made her a loan, it had given rise to Peachy's insane jealousy, with fatal results.

Jim goes to the police, but they do not believe him. When they come to take him into custody, Jim flees. He follows Peachy to Paddington Station and discovers from a tag on the man’s luggage that he intends to flee the country by plane. He phones Godby with the flight information, but when that appears to have no effect, he contemplates suicide again. Then, a letter Molly had posted to Wilcox just before her death is found. It incriminates Peachy, who is arrested. Jenny finds Jim and gives him the good news.

Cast

John Mills as Jim Ackland
Joan Greenwood as Jenny Carden
Edward Chapman as Mr. Peachy
Kay Walsh as Molly Newman
Joyce Carey as Mrs. Vinton, a hotel resident
Catherine Lacey as Miss Selby, the hotel manager
Patrick Holt as Harry Carden
Felix Aylmer as Dr. Martin
Frederick Piper as Detective Inspector Godby
John Boxer as Detective Sergeant Troth
George Benson as Mr. Pope, a sympathetic hotel resident
Jack Melford as Wilcox
Adrianne Allen as Joyce Carden
Esme Beringer as Miss Heap
Ann Wilton as Miss Parsons
James Hayter as Garage man
Sid James as uncredited man who bumps into Ackland when he first arrives at Brockhurst Common

Cast notes:
 John Mills' daughter, Juliet Mills, plays the part of the young child who is killed in a bus accident at the beginning of the film. She was five years old at the time, and it was her third film appearance.

Production
Director Roy Ward Baker was an assistant director for Alfred Hitchcock on The Lady Vanishes (1938), while cinematographer Erwin Hillier had photographed Michael Powell and Emeric Pressburger's I Know Where I'm Going (1945). The film was made at Denham Studios in Buckinghamshire, England, and location shooting was done at Paddington Station in London. The film's sets were designed by the art director Alex Vetchinsky. Eric Ambler's screenplay is sometimes stated to be from a novel by Ambler, but there is no such novel.

Reception
In his New York Times review, Bosley Crowther called it a "second rate film" with "a first-rate actor [John Mills]...surrounded by a generally competent cast". In general, though, the film received good critical notices.

According to trade papers, the film was a "notable box office attraction" at British cinemas in 1947.

Notes

External links
 
 
 
 

1947 films
1947 mystery films
British mystery films
British black-and-white films
Film noir
Films directed by Roy Ward Baker
Films scored by William Alwyn
Films set in London
Films shot at Denham Film Studios
1947 directorial debut films
1940s English-language films
1940s British films